Prosper Mortou (1862–1925) was a French musician and painter.

1862 births
1925 deaths
French musicians
19th-century French painters
French male painters
20th-century French painters
20th-century French male artists
19th-century French male artists